SS Bovic was a steamship built by Harland and Wolff in Belfast for the White Star Line.

History
The ship was intended for the Atlantic cattle trade and able to carry about 1,050 cattle on the upper main deck and had special accommodation for horses amidships. Designed to carry livestock with a small number of passengers, she was later converted into a passenger ship.

In February 1914, all four of her masts were cut down to the height of her funnels so she could pass under the Manchester canal bridges.
On 19 August 1915, while off the coast of southern Ireland, she narrowly avoided destruction by what is believed to be the German U-boat , which had sunk four other vessels, including White Star Line's  in the same area that day. Bovic was pursued by the submarine, but managed to escape.

In April 1917 she was requisitioned for war service.

She resumed White Star Line service between 1919, before going back to the Manchester Joint Service in 1921.

In January 1922 she was sold to the Leyland Line and renamed Colonian, and her masts were back to their normal height. She was scrapped at Rotterdam in 1928.

References 

1892 ships
Ships built in Belfast
Steamships
Victorian-era passenger ships of the United Kingdom
Ships of the White Star Line
Ships built by Harland and Wolff